The Yakushima gecko (Gekko yakuensis) is a species of gecko. It is endemic to Japan, including the Ryukyu Islands.

References

Gekko
Reptiles described in 1968
Endemic reptiles of Japan